National Institute of Biomedical Genomics (NIBMG) is a national level research institute for genomic medicine in India. It is located at Kalyani West Bengal—50 km from Kolkata. It has been established as an autonomous institution under the Department of Biotechnology, Government of India. This is the first institution in India explicitly devoted to research, training, translation, service, and capacity-building in biomedical genomics.

The Institute operates from a campus constructed on a 30-acre plot of land near Bidhanpally, Kalyani.

See also
Indian Institute of Science Education and Research, Kolkata
Indian Statistical Institute
Bose Institute
Indian Institute of Chemical Biology

References

External links 
 

Research institutes in Kolkata
Biological research institutes
Medical research institutes in India
Kalyani, West Bengal
Research institutes in West Bengal
2009 establishments in West Bengal
Research institutes established in 2009